Alpago is a comune in the Province of Belluno in the Italian region Veneto.

Alpago may also refer to:

People
 Andrea Alpago (c. 1450–1521), Italian physician and Arabist
 Önay Alpago (born 1947), Turkish female jurist, politician and academic

See also
 Chies d'Alpago, Italian comune